Zoo Entertainment was an American record label formed in 1990 by Lou Maglia. Zoo released three platinum records by the group  Tool, as well as gold records by Green Jellÿ and Matthew Sweet. During the record company's early years, music industry executive George Daly was the label's original Vice President of A&R.

History
The label was formed in 1990 by Lou Maglia, former president of Island Records.
As early as 1993, Zoo was having financial difficulties. The record label also distributed Gamble & Huff's Philadelphia International Records for a short time. Being its distributor, the late Phyllis Hyman enjoyed a #1 R&B hit with "Don't Wanna Change The World," a song that was taken to US radio by radio promoter Jesus Garber, then a VP at Zoo.

In 1995, BMG reduced the staff at Zoo, foreshadowing problems for the label.

In August 1996, BMG sold Zoo to Kevin Czinger's newly formed Volcano Entertainment. It began as a partnership between the two labels, but by the end of 1997 the Zoo name had been phased out. All of Zoo's artists were absorbed by the new Volcano imprint. Volcano went through changes and was eventually sold to the Zomba Label Group in the spring of 1998.  When Zomba was purchased by BMG in 2002, any remaining Zoo artists were returned to the BMG fold. BMG's assets were sold in 2008 to Sony Corporation of America and the back catalog is now handled by Sony Music Group through Volcano.

Artists
 20 Fingers
 7 Year Bitch
 Ajax
 Akinyele
 Alcohol Funnycar
 Bad Boys Blue
 Big Star
 Bleu
 Blue Train
 Calamity Jane
 Cause & Effect
 Clarence Clemons
 Coming Of Age
 Course of Empire
 Cosmic Travelers
 Crowbar
 Disturbance
 Dogstar
 Drive
 Flowerhead
 Gary Hoey
 Gillette
 Great White
 Green Jellÿ
 Hoodoo Gurus
 Kemelions
 Killers
 Killing Joke
 Little Feat
 Last Gentlemen
 Lazet Michaels
 Lusk
 Love Jones
 Matthew Sweet
 Max-A-Million
 Miss Alans
 Morpheus
 Nature
 N.F.B.
 Odds
 Oliver Who?
 Overlords
 Philip Bailey
 Phyllis Hyman
 Pood, Bhud, 'N' Pflug
 The Pooh Sticks
 Procol Harum
 Steve Pryor Band
 Street Mentality
 Red Square Black
 Replicants
 Rhythm Tribe
 Rosco Martinez
 Self
 Shaver
 Spelvins
 Tool
 Tung Twista
 Varga
 Voices
 Webb Wilder

See also
 List of record labels
 Volcano Entertainment
 Freeworld Entertainment

References

 
Record labels established in 1990
Record labels disestablished in 1997
Alternative rock record labels
Defunct record labels of the United States
Tool (band)
Bertelsmann subsidiaries
Sony Music